Primrose is an islet in Palmerston Island in the Cook Islands. It is on the southeastern edge of the atoll, between Karakerake and Toms. The islet is named after a ship which was wrecked there.

References

Palmerston Island